Hedong Subdistrict is a subdistrict of Maonan District, in the heart of Maoming, Guangdong, People's Republic of China. , it has 16 residential communities under its administration.

See also
List of township-level divisions of Guangdong

References

Township-level divisions of Guangdong
Maoming
Subdistricts of the People's Republic of China